Cragus or Cragos or Kragos was a city of ancient Lycia, Asia Minor near or on Mount Cragus; its location is in modern-day Turkey (possibly in Muğla Province).  Strabo, describes Cragus as a city amidst Mount Cragus. There are coins of the town Cragus of the Roman imperial period, with the epigraph Λυκιων Κρ. or Κρα. or Κραγ.  The site of Cragus has not been determined. William Martin Leake (Geog. Journal, vol. xii. p. 164) conjectures that Cragus may be the same city as Sidyma, a place that is first mentioned by Pliny the Elder.

References

Roman towns and cities in Turkey
Populated places in ancient Lycia
Roman sites in Turkey
Former populated places in Turkey
Lost ancient cities and towns